The Aveluy Wood Cemetery (also known as the Lancashire Dump) is a cemetery located in the Somme region of France commemorating British and Commonwealth soldiers who fought in the Battle of the Somme in World War I. The cemetery honors mainly those who died on the front near Aveluy Wood and the village of Aveluy from June 1916 to February 1917 and from April to September 1918.

Location 
The cemetery is located in Mesnil-Martinsart, near the D50 road and the village of Aveluy, which is approximately 5 km north of the town of Albert, France.

Fighting around Aveluy Wood 

The British 32nd and 36th divisions held the area near Aveluy Wood (which they called "Lancashire Dump") from the beginning of the Battle of the Somme on 1 July 1916 to the German retreat to the Hindenburg Line in February 1917. The Germans returned to the wood on the night of 26 March 1918 as part of the final major German offensive in Western Europe, and had taken the area from the 12th Eastern, 47th London, and 63rd Royal Naval divisions by 5 April. The wood was then repeatedly attacked by Allied forces until it was recaptured in August 1918.

Establishment of the Cemetery

History 
The cemetery was begun in June 1916, a few days before the beginning of the First Battle of the Somme. It was used by units and field ambulances until the German withdrawal to the Hindenburg Line in February 1917. The cemetery remained mostly unused until the spring 1918 German offensive, when more graves were added to Row H of Plot I. After the end of the war, Plots II and III were created and filled with graves moved in from Aveluy Wood. In 1923, 124 more graves (Rows I to M of Plot I) were brought in from a wider area. The cemetery was designed by Sir Richard Blomfield.

Layout 
The cemetery is flanked on both sides by low hedges, and is located several steps under ground level. It is fan shaped, with a Cross of Sacrifice located in the middle and a stone bench with the names of the missing inscribed on the sides located in the back.

Statistics 
The cemetery contains a total of around 380 burials, of which 209 are identified and 171 are unidentified. There are special memorials dedicated to 20 soldiers known to be buried among the unknown.

References 

World War I cemeteries in France